The Brava Tour was the fourth headlining concert tour by Argentine singer Lali, in support of her third studio album, Brava (2018). The tour began on August 23, 2018, in Buenos Aires and concluded on November 7, 2019, in Washington, D.C.

Throughout October and November, 2018, Lali uploaded a series of performances of a show at the Luna Park Arena to YouTube. The Brava Tour was included on Rolling Stone's best shows of 2018 list.

Background
Following the release of her single "100 Grados", In April 2018 Lali announced that she was going to tour later that year. While still touring with her Lali en Vivo, a second date at the Luna Park Arena had to be added due to high demand. Argentine, Uruguayan and Chilean dates were announced in the following weeks.

On August 23, 2019, Lali announced the American tour dates, including stops at San Antonio, New York City, Nashville, Chicago, Washington, D.C. and Miami. Even though Lali performed in Miami with her Lali en Vivo tour in 2018, this is the first time that she got to tour in multiple cities of the United States.

Concert synopsis
The show begins when a video introduction is displayed on the huge vertical LED screen. The stage simulates to be a garden of eight meters high and sixteen meters wide, surrounded by gigantic roses and lips, representing the aesthetics of the album. After the phrase "Soy brava, babies" (English: "I'm fierce, babies") is heard, Lali appears onstage wearing a golden sequin bodysuit and a fringed jacket to perform "OMG!". The first set also includes "A Bailar", "Histeria", "Irresistible" and "Soy". Lali changes her clothes to perform "Besarte Mucho", accompanied by a sexy choreography. Then, she performs "Somos Amantes", while images of her legs and her body are seen on the main screen. Previous to "Salvaje", she performs a sexy solo dance number on top of rotating platform. After "Sin Querer Queriendo", Lali performs dance remixes of "Boomerang", "Mil Años Luz", "Mi Religión" and "Asesina", and leaves the stage.

The party mood slows down as Lali reappears onstage wearing a long dress and accompanied by a piano to perform "Reina", "Unico" and "Vuelve a Mi". Lali's back up dancers perform a dance interlude while their names appears on the screen. Once again, Lali comes back to the stage to perform "100 Grados". For "Tu Revolución", the lights of the arena turn green as a symbol of the pro-legal abortion movement in Argentina. As Lali performs "Bomba" and "Caliente", the mood rises again. Following "Mi Última Canción" and "Una Na", Lali appears onstage wearing a long-champagne color dress to perform an acoustic set of her ballads "Tu Sonrisa", "Cielo Salvador", "Cree en Mí" and "Del Otro Lado". When the show seems to have finished, Lali returns once again to perform "Ego", "No Estoy Sola" and "Amor Es Presente", wearing pink top and skirt. After two and a half hours, and having performed thirty-one songs, Lali performs "Tu Novia" while confetti rains from the ceiling. She disappears from the stage from the last time, and the big screen displays the word "Brava", indicating that the show has finished.

Controversy
Since Lali proclaimed herself in favor of the voluntary termination of pregnancy in Argentina, where abortion was still illegal at the time, she received negative backlash from the "pro-life" movement. During her Brava Tour, she dedicated her song "Tu Revolución" to the legalization of abortion movement, while the stage lights turned green and green hearts, the color of the pro-choice movement in Argentina, were displayed in the screens. For this reason, the singer had to face anti-abortion resistance in certain cities during the tour. For the show of October 5, 2018 in Salta, a group of people planned to gather outside the venue where Lali was playing to protest against her. However, the number of people gathered was about ten and Lali performed without any problem. For the show of October 27, 2018 in Corrientes, Lali was banned from performing in the city after repeated calls from the pro-life movement to protest and repudiate her show. Even though the singer reportedly received death threats, her team stated that the show was cancelled on "reasons other than the artist's and local production's." For the show of February 11, 2019, in Neuquén, a pro-life party made a petition through Change.org in which they asked the city's mayor to "review [Lali's visit to the city] as it could be incurring in an indirect promotion of the legalization of abortion." On the other hand, Actrices Argentinas, a Feminist group of Argentine actresses of which Lali is part of, called for everyone to attend the show and lift up their green scarves, which are a sign of the pro-legal abortion movement in Argentina. Despite every attempt to cancel her show, Lali performed without any problem for an audience of 160 thousand people. The situation repeated again in Cipolletti, Río Negro, where pro-life people tried to boycott the show.

Set list
This set list is representative of the show on August 23, 2018 in Buenos Aires, Argentina.

"OMG!"
"A Bailar"
"Histeria"
"Irresistible"
"Soy"
"Besarte Mucho"
"Somos Amantes"
"Salvaje"
"Sin Querer Queriendo"
"Mi Mala (Remix)"
"Boomerang" 
"Mi Religión"
"Mil Años Luz"
"Asesina" 
"Reina"
"Unico"
"Vuelve a Mi"
"100 Grados"
"Tu Revolución"
"Bomba"
"Caliente"
"Mi Última Canción"
"Una Na"
"Tu Sonrisa"
"Cielo Salvador"
"Cree en Mí"
"Del Otro Lado"
"Ego"
"No Estoy Sola"
"Amor Es Presente"
"Tu Novia"

Shows

Cancelled shows

Notes

References

Lali Espósito concert tours
2018 concert tours
2019 concert tours
Concert tours of South America
Concert tours of North America
Concert tours of Europe
Concert tours of Asia